Justice Grimes may refer to:

Elizabeth A. Grimes (born 1954), associate justice of the California Second District Court of Appeal
Louis Arthur Grimes (1883–1948), chief justice of Liberia
Stephen H. Grimes (1927–2021), chief justice of the Supreme Court of Florida
William Alvan Grimes (1911–1999), chief justice of the New Hampshire Supreme Court